The Lag da Breil (German: Brigelser See) is a lake located east of Breil/Brigels in the canton of Graubünden. It lies at a height of 1,255 metres above sea level and has a maximum length of 500 metres.

In summer the Lag da Breil is used as a bathing lake.

See also
List of mountain lakes of Switzerland

References

Swisstopo topographic maps

External links
Brigelser See Badesee Graubünden.ch (German)

Lakes of Graubünden
Breil/Brigels